Euptera crowleyi, or Crowley's euptera, is a butterfly in the family Nymphalidae. It is found in Ivory Coast, Ghana, Togo, Nigeria, Cameroon, the Republic of the Congo, the Central African Republic and the Democratic Republic of the Congo. The habitat consists of drier forests and wet forests.

The larvae feed on Pachystela brevipes and Englerophytum oubanguiense.

Subspecies
Euptera crowleyi crowleyi (Ivory Coast, Ghana, Togo, Nigeria, western Cameroon)
Euptera crowleyi centralis Libert, 1995 (Cameroon, Congo, Central African Republic, Congo, Democratic Republic of the Congo: north to Mayumbe, Equateur, Uele and Tshopo)

References

Butterflies described in 1889
Euptera
Butterflies of Africa
Taxa named by William Forsell Kirby